The Unclaimed Baggage Center is a retail store located in Scottsboro in Jackson County, Alabama, US. The store's concept of reselling of lost or unclaimed airline luggage has received national attention over the years, including mentions on The Oprah Winfrey Show, Late Night with David Letterman, Fox News and the Today show. Over a million customers visit the  store each year to browse through some of the 7,000 items added each day. According to Thrillist, most items are sold for a discount of 20–80%.

References

External links 
Unclaimed Baggage Center (official site)
Article Discussing Unclaimed Baggage

Companies based in Alabama
Tourist attractions in Jackson County, Alabama
Buildings and structures in Jackson County, Alabama